Steinach is a river of Thuringia and Bavaria, Germany. Its source is near Neuhaus am Rennweg, and it flows to the south, passing through the towns Steinach and Sonneberg. It is a right tributary of the Rodach, which it joins near Redwitz an der Rodach.

See also
List of rivers of Thuringia
List of rivers of Bavaria

References

Rivers of Thuringia
Rivers of Bavaria
Kronach (district)
Coburg (district)
Lichtenfels (district)
Sonneberg (district)
Rivers of Germany